Simon A. Dixon (October 12, 1728 – April, 1781) was the founder and prominent member of the community of Snow Camp, North Carolina. He was also one of the founding members of the Cane Creek Friends Meeting, the first Quaker community in the Piedmont (United States) region of North Carolina.

Biography 

Dixon migrated to the area of Snow Camp, North Carolina from Lancaster County, Pennsylvania in approximately 1750.  He set up a successful gristmill that operated into the 20th century. As a supporter of the resistance to Colonial taxation and as a member of the Regulator Movement, he was a signer of the Regulator Advertisement, and also was present at the Battle of Alamance in 1771. In 1781, his home and mill were briefly seized by General Charles Cornwallis as temporary quarters in the days following the Battle of Guilford Courthouse in 1781.

Tributes 

Simon Dixon is one of the main characters in the 1973 play, Sword of Peace, a dramatic portrayal of the struggles that Quakers faced during the American Revolutionary War.  This play is performed by the Snow Camp Outdoor Theater on a site located near his original dwelling.

Notes

1728 births
1781 deaths
People from Snow Camp, North Carolina
American Quakers
Regulator Movement
Military history of the Thirteen Colonies
Pre-statehood history of North Carolina
People of North Carolina in the American Revolution